Cabdella Lakes is a set of lakes in the Spanish Pyrenees. They are connected by tunnels at the head of the Fosca Valley, at Lleida. The network of lakes provide water to Lake Gento (Estany Gento) where there are two hydroelectric plants, Sallente Reservoir, and Central Hidroelectrica de Cabdella. This system is located in the municipality of La Torre de Cabdella, in the county of Pallars Jussà.

Geography
Cabdella Lakes is a complex system of water storage and resources, which is used by area consumers. It incorporates the Flamisell River, which is part of the Noguera Pallaresa basin. The system was created by the interconnection of approximately 30 glacial lakes, many of which were enlarged with the erection of a small dam which increased the lakes' original capacity. The Sallente Reservoir regulates the system at Lake Gento. The Central Hidroelectrica de Cabdella was constructed in 1985. This hydroelectric plant uses the water collected by a large network of underground channels which were built in the early 20th century. The hydroelectric plant is reversible, using the surplus electricity produced at certain times of the day.

Trail
A  walking trail follows with the route of the old narrow-gauge railway used to transport materials and workers when construction began in 1912. The trail includes several tunnels, long loops, the dammed Lake Gento, the Sallente Reservoir, and views of granite peaks.

Larger lakes within the system

 Gento Lake
 Mar
 Colomina
 Xic de Colomina
 Saburó
 Petit de Saburó
 Saburó d’Amunt
 Tort
 Vidal
 Vidals d’Amunt
 Frescau
 Mariolo
 Cubieso
 Etserola
 Castieso
 Morto
 Carbonera
 Fosser
 Morera
 Grenut
 Cogomella
 Travessan
 Reguera
 Salado
 Francí
 Ribanegra
 Castell

References

Bibliography

External links 

 http://www.unioviedo.net/reunido/index.php/RCG/article/viewFile/957/883 (in Spanish)
 http://www.pallarsjussa.net/es/vive-la-naturaleza/embalses-y-lagos (in Spanish)
 http://www.patrimonihidroelectric.com/es/fitxers/BIBLIOGRAFIA%20VALL%20FOSCA.pdf (in Spanish)
 http://www.ub.edu/geocrit/Simposio/cBoneta_Lasconstrucciones.pdf (in Spanish)
 http://www.vallfosca.net/ca/coses-per-fer-i-veure/museu-hidroelectric-de-capdella/ (in Spanish)
 http://sortidesambgracia.com/2013/05/16/el-museu-hidroelectric-de-capdella-2/ (in Spanish)

Geography of the Province of Lleida
Lakes of Catalonia